Flying Emus are an Australian country/bluegrass band that formed in 1984 and released four studio albums, including, This Town, which won an ARIA Award for Best Country Album in 1988. They disbanded in 1990. At the Country Music Awards of Australia in January 2013, John Kane (guitar, mandolin), announced they had reformed with other founders: his younger sister Genni Kane on lead vocals and guitar, Mike Kerin on violin and mandolin and Ian Simpson on banjo, joined by new member Michael Vidale on bass guitar.

History

1984-1991

In 1984 the Flying Emus were formed in Sydney with Genni Kane and her older brother John Kane, Mike Kerin, and Ian Simpson, as a country, bluegrass group. In 1985 the band released their debut studio album, Look Out Below, which won Instrumental of the Year at the 1986 CMAA Country Music Awards. At the same ceremony they won Vocal Group of the Year for their song "Diamond Creek". At the 1987 CMAA awards, the band took Instrumental of the Year again, for the track "Emu Strut". In October 1986 they supported Steeleye Span in a show at the Canberra Theatre, where local correspondent Robert Hefner of The Canberra Times praised the vocals of Genni Kane, violin work by Kerin and banjo by Simpson.

In 1987 the band released This Town and in September of that year they supported Suzanne Vega at the Sydney Town Hall. Tharunkas Jim Dwyer felt the venue did not suit their intimate style. At the 1988 CMAA awards the group won Instrumental of the Year for the third consecutive year with the track "Jackaroo", and secured another Vocal Group of the Year for "Auctioneer". They won Best Country Album for This Town at the ARIA Music Awards of 1988.

In 1989 the band released Postcards from Paradise, which was nominated for an ARIA Award for Best Country Album in 1990. Also in that year they released their final studio album, Thank You and Goodnight, before breaking up. At the 1991 CMAA awards they won Instrumental of the Year for the fourth time with the track "Dixie Breakdown".

2013-present: Reformation and The Collection

In January 2013 at the Country Music Awards of Australia, band member John Kane announced the group were reforming. In December 2013 the Flying Emus announced a reunion tour for January 2014 with the four original members (John and Genni Kane, Simpson and Kerin) joined by Michael Vidale on violin. A compilation album, Flying Emus: The Collection, was released through Warner Music on 10 January 2014, with tracks from the band's four albums spanning from 1984 to 1990.

Members 

 Genni Kane (Genevieve Wilby) – lead vocals, guitar
 John Kane – guitar, mandolin
 Mike Kerin – violin, mandolin, guitar, vocals
 Ian Simpson – banjo, guitar
 Hanuman Dass – percussion
 Graham Thompson – bass guitar
 Michael Vidale – bass guitar
 Malcolm Wakeford – drums, percussion
 Wayne Goodwin – violin
 Lucky Oceans – pedal steel guitar
 Michael Rose – pedal steel guitar
Credits:

Discography

Singles

Awards

ARIA Music Awards

The ARIA Music Awards is an annual awards ceremony that recognises excellence, innovation, and achievement across all genres of Australian music. Flying Emus have won one awards from five nominations.

|-
|rowspan="2"| 1988 ||rowspan="2"| This Town || ARIA Award for Best Country Album || 
|-
| ARIA Award for Best Indigenous Release || 
|-
|rowspan="2"| 1989 || "I Just Want to Dance With You" ||Best Country Album || 
|-
| "This Town" / "Darling Street" || Best Indigenous Release || 
|-
| 1990 || Postcards From Paradise || Best Country Album || 
|-

Country Music Awards of Australia
The Country Music Awards of Australia (CMAA) (also known as the Golden Guitar Awards) is an annual awards night held in January during the Tamworth Country Music Festival, celebrating recording excellence in the Australian country music industry. They have been held annually since 1973. Flying Emus have won six awards.

|-
| 1986 || "Look Out Below" || Instrumental of the Year  || 
|-
| 1986 || "Diamond Creek" || Vocal Group of the Year  || 
|-
| 1987 || "Emu Strut" || Instrumental of the Year  || 
|-
| 1988 || "Auctioneer"  || Vocal Group of the Year  || 
|-
| 1988 || "Jackaroo" || Instrumental of the Year || 
|-
| 1991 || "Dixie Breakdown" || Instrumental of the Year || 

 Note: Wins only

References

ARIA Award winners
Australian country music groups
Australian bluegrass music groups
1984 establishments in Australia
Musical groups disestablished in 1990
Musical groups established in 1984